Enar is a Nordic male given name. Notable people with this name include:

 Enar Bolaños (born 1983), Costa Rican striker
 Enar Edberg (1936–2013), Swedish weightlifter
 Enar Josefsson (1916–1989), Swedish cross-country skier
 Enar Jääger (born 1984), Estonian football player

See also
Einar
 European Network Against Racism

Swedish masculine given names